WikiStage is a video platform and a network of event organisers managed by the non-profit WikiStage Association. It aims to create a collaborative video platform for debate.
Conferences around the world use the WikiStage platform to share their speaker’s videos. To connect talks with those of other speakers, the videos are grouped into a debate according to their topic. The debate wall allows users to watch and vote for short videos from different sources on the topic in question.

In addition to partnering with conferences around the world, WikiStage allows the members of its community to organise WikiStage branded conferences under the WikiStage license for free. The talks filmed at these conferences are then published on the WikiStage website and YouTube to ensure unlimited, free access. A community of over 100 volunteers in 12 countries is spread over 4 continents to curate the video library.

Origin of the Name 
According to the founder, the "Wiki" brand was chosen because the organisation follows the objectives and values of other Wiki Projects: to create a library of knowledge through an open and collaborative approach where the users produce the content. WikiStage is an independent organisation and uses the protected trademarks “WikiStage” and “WikiTalk”.

Objectives 
The objective of WikiStage is to encourage democratic debate and to bring forward ideas from experts around the world. 
The organisation states they “provide a stage for the world's most interesting questions”. With their global network of events and video debate platform WikiStage aims to “improve education and strengthen democratic debate”.

The WikiTalk 
The presentations published on WikiStage are called WikiTalks. The short talks of three, six or nine minutes  each address a specific topic and cover questions ranging from history and philosophy to genetics, and jazz. Promotional presentations or extreme views in WikiTalks are not allowed.

WikiTalks are typically filmed at conferences, but they can also be recorded with just a camera and a speaker. A recording session of five to ten experts is called a  'WikiCorner' and can be organised by anyone after acquiring a WikiCorner license.

WikiStage Events 

The first WikiStage Event took place at ESCP Europe Paris in March 2013 under the motto “Celebrate Curiosity”.
Subsequently, WikiStage spread in other French schools such as Sciences Po, École Centrale Paris and Paris Dauphine University. Up until July 2016, seventy events have been held at institutions like the Chamber of Commerce in Nouakchott, Mauretania, Stanford University and the Worldbank.

WikiStage Events are organised collaboratively under the free license granted by the WikiStage Association. Anyone may request to organise a WikiStage Event. Once the license is granted, the WikiStage Association provides the local organisers with support, toolkits and guides. The local organiser designs the program of the event, records the talks and performances, then edits and uploads them to the WikiStage YouTube channel and website. Speakers are asked to prepare their talk prior to the event and encouraged to share their talks under the Creative Commons license.

Sources

External links 
 http://www.wikistage.org
 http://www.wikistage.org/press/

Non-profit organizations based in France
Organizations established in 2013
Education-related YouTube channels
Wikis